The Madrean Sky Islands are enclaves of Madrean pine–oak woodlands, found at higher elevations in a complex of small mountain ranges in southern and southeastern Arizona, southwestern New Mexico, and northwestern Mexico. The sky islands are surrounded at lower elevations by the Sonoran and Chihuahuan deserts. The northern west–east perimeter of the sky island region merges into the higher elevation eastern Mogollon Rim and the White Mountains of eastern Arizona (southern Anasazi region).

The sky islands are the northernmost of the Madrean pine–oak woodlands, and are classified as part of the Sierra Madre Occidental pine–oak forests ecoregion, of the tropical and subtropical coniferous forests biome. The sky islands were isolated from one another and from the pine–oak woodlands of the Sierra Madre Occidental to the south by the warming and drying of the climate since the ice ages.

There are approximately 27 Madrean sky islands in the United States, and 15 in northern Mexico.  The major Madrean sky island ranges in Arizona are the Baboquivari Mountains, Chiricahua Mountains, Huachuca Mountains, Pinaleño Mountains, Santa Catalina Mountains, Santa Rita Mountains and Whetstone Mountains. Similar sky island ranges include the Animas Mountains in New Mexico and the Guadalupe Mountains, Davis Mountains and Chisos Mountains in west Texas.

Significant urban areas located very close to the Madrean Sky Islands include Las Cruces, New Mexico, and Tucson, Arizona.

Fauna

Though formerly extirpated from the United States, the North American jaguar has returned to the area from northern Mexico in small numbers. One such jaguar is named El Jefe.

See also
 Madrean Region
 List of birds of the Madrean Sky Islands
 List of Madrean Sky Island mountain ranges – Sonoran – Chihuahuan Deserts
 Malpai Borderlands

References

External links
 Sky Island Alliance homepage
 U.S. Geologic Survey: Biology of the Southwestern Sky Island Ecosystems
 Bioimages.vanderbilt.edu: Madrean Sky Islands Montane Forests images;  (slow modem version)
 

 
Tropical and subtropical coniferous forests
Tropical and subtropical coniferous forests of the United States
Ecoregions of Mexico
Ecoregions of the United States
Natural history of Arizona
Natural history of New Mexico
Natural history of Sonora
Natural history of Chihuahua (state)
Sierra Madre Occidental